see also: 19th century in games, 1910s in games

This page lists board and card games published in the 1900s (decade).

Games released or invented in the 1900s
Monopoly (1904)
Rook (1906)
Touring (1906)

Games
Games by decade